Grey Area (stylised as GREY Area) is the third studio album by English rapper Little Simz, released on 1 March 2019 through Age 101 Music and AWAL.

Release
"Offence" was released as a single on 17 September 2018. "Boss" was released as a single on 23 September 2018. "101 FM" was released as a single on 4 December 2018. "Selfish" was released on 16 January 2019 along with the announcement of Grey Area.

Critical reception

At Metacritic, which assigns a normalised rating out of 100 to reviews from mainstream publications, the album received an average score of 91, based on 15 reviews.

In the review for AllMusic, Liam Martin praised the album by claiming that "On her third full-length album, Grey Area, Simz has reached a new peak, with an honest record that isn't afraid to take shots at the world at large. It's also incredibly concise -- an aspect that many of her peers often miss the mark on -- with no filler despite the broad variation the record boasts." Kyann-Sian Williams of NME praised the album, giving it a perfect score and saying, "Across these 10 tracks, Simz utilises her most valuable commodity: honesty. Having stripped away the narrative cloak that shrouded the highlights of 'Stillness In Wonderland', she's crafted a knockout record – and finally come true on her early promise. This is the best rap record of the year so far." William Rosebury of The Line of Best Fit said, "It's brave but vulnerable, energetic but reflective and youthful but wise. If you listen to any Little Simz track, you'll know instantly she's a great MC, but with this project she has stepped beyond that to become a uniquely gifted artist. An incredible album."

Track listing

Charts

References

2019 albums
Little Simz albums
Age 101 Music albums
AWAL albums
Albums produced by Inflo